Frédéric Adjiwanou (born 17 July 1980) is a French professional basketball player who played for French Pro A league clubs in Reims, Le Mans, Orleans and Dijon between 2005 and 2010. He last played for JSA Bordeaux of the LNB Pro B.

References

External links
 Ligue Nationale de Basket scorecard

1980 births
Living people
Aix Maurienne Savoie Basket players
Champagne Châlons-Reims Basket players
French expatriate basketball people in the United States
French men's basketball players
JDA Dijon Basket players
JSA Bordeaux Basket players
Junior college men's basketball players in the United States
Le Mans Sarthe Basket players
Limoges CSP players
Olympique Antibes basketball players
Orléans Loiret Basket players
Saint Mary's Gaels men's basketball players
Centers (basketball)
People from Annemasse
Sportspeople from Haute-Savoie